The 2015 PartyPoker.com World Grand Prix was the eighteenth staging of the World Grand Prix. It was played from 4–10 October 2015 at the Citywest Hotel in Dublin, Ireland.

Michael van Gerwen was the defending champion, after beating James Wade 5–3 in sets in the previous year's final, but he was beaten 5–4 in the final by Robert Thornton.

Prize money
The total prize money remained at £400,000. The following is the breakdown of the fund:

Qualification
The field of 32 players is made up from the top 16 on the PDC Order of Merit on September 14. The remaining 16 places went to the top 14 non-qualified players from the ProTour Order of Merit and then to the top two non-qualified residents of the Republic of Ireland and Northern Ireland from the 2015 ProTour Order of Merit. The top eight players are seeded in the tournament.

Draw
The draw was made on 27 September 2015.

References

World Grand Prix (darts)
World Grand Prix
World Grand Prix (darts)
World Grand Prix (darts)
World Grand Prix (darts), 2015